Miphora is a genus of true bugs belonging to the family Aphrophoridae.

Species
Species:

Miphora arisanella 
Miphora shirakii 
Miphora taiwana

References

Aphrophoridae